This is a list of the National Register of Historic Places listings in Waller County, Texas.

This is intended to be a complete list of properties listed on the National Register of Historic Places in Waller County, Texas. There are seven properties listed on the National Register in the county along with one property that has been removed. One property is a Recorded Texas Historic Landmark. The remainder belonged to a Multiple Property Submission of buildings on the campus of Prairie View A&M University.

Current listings

The locations of National Register properties may be seen in a mapping service provided.

|}

Former listings

|}

See also

National Register of Historic Places listings in Texas
Recorded Texas Historic Landmarks in Waller County

References

External links

Waller County, Texas
Waller County
Buildings and structures in Waller County, Texas